"Ole Buttermilk Sky" was a big hit in 1946 for Kay Kyser and other artists. It has been covered by a multitude of artists over the years. The following year, it was nominated for the Academy Award for Best Original Song at the 19th Academy Awards.

Background
The song was composed by Hoagy Carmichael and Jack Brooks, and introduced by Carmichael in the film Canyon Passage.

Composition
"Ole Buttermilk Sky" was primarily written as a cowboy song to set the scene where the character meets his lover. The song also used jazz music for the lyric "can't you see my little donkey and me".

Chart performance
It was recorded in the December 14 issue of The Billboard that "Ole Buttermilk Sky" by Kay Kyser was at #1 in the Best Selling Popular Retail Records section. Having moved up two notches from its previous position of #3, it had been in the chart for the past seven weeks. A version by Helen Carroll and the Satisfiers was at #8. Paul Weston and his Orchestra with Matt Dennis had their version at #9.

For the week ending December 14, 1946, in the Most Played Juke Box Records chart, it showed that the song was getting many plays and there were five versions getting attention. Kay Kyser's version on Columbia 37073 had been on the chart was at #2. Hoagy Carmichaels version was at #5. Paul Weston and his Orchestra with Matt Dennis were at #9. Helen Carroll and the Satisfiers were at #15. And a version by Connee Boswell was coming up.

Awards and honors
"Ole Buttermilk Sky" was nominated for the Academy Award for Best Original Song at the 19th Academy Awards in 1947.

References

1946 songs
1946 singles
Songs with music by Hoagy Carmichael
Songs with lyrics by Jack Brooks (lyricist)
Songs written for films
Pop standards
Number-one singles in the United States